†Nerrhenidae is an extinct taxonomic family of fossil sea snails, marine gastropod mollusks. Nerrhenidae is the only family in the superfamily Nerrhenoidea.

Genera
Genera within the family Nerrhenidae include:

 Nerrhena - the type genus

References

 Paleobiology Database info